Blue Sky Aviation Services is a domestic airline in Kenya. It has offices in Nairobi and Mombasa. The airline began operation in 1996 with a single Cessna 402. Their operating fleet consists of three Let L-410 Turbolet, model E9s and E20s. The Let 410 aircraft seats 19 passengers.

Destinations
The destination list includes several airfields and cities throughout Kenya, including Nairobi, Lamu, Malindi, Mombasa, Ukunda and destinations in the interior of interest to tourists, such as several airfields within Maasai Mara and the Amboseli Airport.

References

Further reading
"African Airline Directory 2010." World Airnews. Accessed October 2011.

External links 
 

Airlines of Kenya
Airlines established in 1996
Kenyan companies established in 1996